Christian Dorda (born 6 December 1988) is a German professional football coach and a former player who played as a left-back. He is an assistant coach with SSVg Velbert.

Career
Born in Mönchengladbach, Dorda made his debut for his hometown club Borussia Mönchengladbach's main squad on 8 November 2008 when he started in a Bundesliga game against Arminia Bielefeld. In June 2011, he joined Greuther Fürth.

On 10 July 2012, Dorda signed a two-year contract with Dutch club Heracles Almelo with an option for a third year. After playing 31 matches for Heracles, Dorda was sold to FC Utrecht on 30 January 2014. He signed for 2.5 years. After he could not impress with Utrecht, he left on a free transfer and signed with Belgian side Westerlo.

In summer 2015, Dorda joined Hansa Rostock for two years.

References

External links
 
 
 Voetbal International profile 

1988 births
Living people
Sportspeople from Mönchengladbach
German footballers
Footballers from North Rhine-Westphalia
Association football defenders
Borussia Mönchengladbach players
Borussia Mönchengladbach II players
SpVgg Greuther Fürth players
Heracles Almelo players
FC Utrecht players
K.V.C. Westerlo players
FC Hansa Rostock players
KFC Uerdingen 05 players
SSVg Velbert players
Regionalliga players
Bundesliga players
3. Liga players
Eredivisie players
Belgian Pro League players
German expatriate footballers
German expatriate sportspeople in the Netherlands
Expatriate footballers in the Netherlands
German expatriate sportspeople in Belgium
Expatriate footballers in Belgium